Maacama Creek is a  stream in northern Sonoma County, California, U.S.A., which empties into the Russian River near the city of Healdsburg.

Course
Maacama Creek begins at the confluence of McDonnell Creek and Briggs Creek near Peter Hill in the Mayacamas Mountains. From there, it flows south, paralleling Briggs Ranch Road almost to State Route 128, where it turns westward. It parallels the highway for about  before passing under to meet Redwood Creek. Upon entering the Alexander Valley, it turns southward again and parallels Chalk Hill Road until it meets Franz Creek.

History

Habitat and pollution
As of 2000, Maacama Creek and all its major tributaries all supported steelhead trout. Franz Creek also harbored California freshwater shrimp, and Redwood Creek and Maacama Creek hosted coho salmon.

Bridges
Two bridges span Maacama Creek: The Chalk Hill Road bridge is a  concrete arch built in 1915, and State Route 128 crosses the creek at milepost 17.25 on a  concrete continuous tee beam built in 1931.

See also
List of watercourses in the San Francisco Bay Area

References

Rivers of Sonoma County, California
Healdsburg, California
Rivers of Northern California
Tributaries of the Russian River (California)